Deepavali is a 2000 Indian Kannada-language drama film starring Vishnuvardhan, Ramesh Aravind, Chandini and Bhavana. The film is directed and written by Dinesh Babu.

Cast 
 Vishnuvardhan as Ravi alias Ravindranath
 Ramesh Aravind as Hari alias Harichander
 Bhavana as Anu
 Chandini as Nandhini
 Ragasudha
 Ramesh Bhat
 Hema Choudhary
 K.R.Vijaya
 Sanketh Kashi
 Mandeep Roy
 Tennis Krishna
 Shivaram
 Deepa Bhaskar

Soundtrack 

All the songs are composed and scored by M. M. Keeravani.

References

External links 
Movie preview at Online Bangalore

2000 films
2000s Kannada-language films
Films scored by M. M. Keeravani
Indian drama films
Films directed by Dinesh Baboo